Cymothoe fumana, the scalloped yellow glider, is a butterfly in the family Nymphalidae. It is found in Guinea, Sierra Leone, Liberia, Ivory Coast, Ghana, Nigeria, Cameroon, Equatorial Guinea, Gabon, the Republic of the Congo, the Central African Republic and the Democratic Republic of the Congo. The habitat consists of forests.

Adults have been recorded feeding on fermented sap oozing from debarked felled trees.

The larvae feed on Rinorea species.

Subspecies
Cymothoe fumana fumana (Guinea, Sierra Leone, Liberia, Ivory Coast, Ghana)
Cymothoe fumana balluca Fox & Howarth, 1968 (Nigeria: south and the Cross River loop, Cameroon, Equatorial Guinea, Gabon, Congo, Central African Republic, western Democratic Republic of the Congo)
Cymothoe fumana villiersi Fox, 1968 (Congo: Monts Chaillu)

References

Butterflies described in 1850
Cymothoe (butterfly)